Riverview Park may refer to:

Parks
 Riverview Park (Eau Claire, Wisconsin), public park
 Riverview Park (Hannibal, Missouri), public park
 Riverview Park (Pittsburgh), Pennsylvania, public park
 Riverview Park (San Jose), California, public park

Amusement parks
 Riverview Park (Baltimore), a former Maryland amusement park
 Riverview Park (Chicago), a former Illinois amusement park
 Riverview Park (Detroit), Michigan, an alternative name for Electric Park, a former amusement park
 Riverview Park & Zoo, in Peterborough, Ontario, Canada
 Riverview Park (Iowa), a former amusement park in Des Moines, Iowa

Neighborhoods and places
 Riverview Park, Pennsylvania, census-designated place in Berks County
 Riverview Park Plat Historic District, Des Moines, Iowa
 Riverview, Ottawa, Canada, a neighborhood also known as Riverview Park

See also
 Riverview (disambiguation)